The Minimal Residual Method or MINRES is a Krylov subspace method for the iterative solution of symmetric linear equation systems. It was proposed by mathematicians Christopher Conway Paige and Michael Alan Saunders in 1975.

In contrast to the popular CG method, the MINRES method does not assume that the matrix is positive definite, only the symmetry of the matrix is mandatory. The popular GMRES method is an improved generalization of MINRES but requires much more memory.

GMRES vs. MINRES 

The GMRES method is essentially a generalization of MINRES for arbitrary matrices. Both minimize the 2-norm of the residual and do the same calculations in exact arithmetic when the matrix is symmetric. MINRES is a short-recurrence method with a constant memory requirement, whereas GMRES requires storing the whole Krylov space, so its memory requirement is roughly proportional to the number of iterations. On the other hand, GMRES tends to suffer less from loss of orthogonality. 

Therefore, MINRES tends to be used only when there is not enough memory for GMRES and the matrix is symmetric. Even then, sometimes other methods are preferred, particularly CG for positive-definite matrices.

Properties of the MINRES method 
The MINRES method iteratively calculates an approximate solution of a linear system of equations of the form

 ,

where  is a symmetric matrix and  a vector.

For this, the norm of the residual  in a -dimensional Krylov subspace

 

is minimized.

More precisely, we define the approximate solutions  through

 ,

This saves memory.

MINRES algorithm 
Note: The MINRES method is more complicated than the algebraically equivalent Conjugate Residual method. The Conjugate Residual (CR) method was therefore produced below as a substitute. It differs from MINRES in that in MINRES, the columns of a basis of the Krylov space (denoted below by ) can be orthogonalized, whereas in CR their images (below labeled with ) can be orthogonalized via the Lanczos recursion. There are more efficient and preconditioned variants with fewer AXPYs. Compare with the article.

First you choose  arbitrary and compute

 
 
 

 Compute  through

 
 
 
 if is smaller than a specified tolerance, the algorithm is interrupted with the approximate solution . Otherwise, a new descent direction  is calculated through
 
 

Convergence rate of the MINRES method 
In the case of positive definite matrices, the convergence rate of the MINRES method can be estimated in a way similar to that of the CG method. In contrast to the CG method, however, the estimation does not apply to the errors of the iterates, but to the residual. The following applies:

 ,

where  is the condition number of matrix . Because  is normal, we have

 

Implementation in GNU Octave / MATLAB 
function [x, r] = minres(A, b, x0, maxit, tol)
  x = x0;
  r = b - A * x0;
  p0 = r;
  s0 = A * p0;
  p1 = p0;
  s1 = s0;
  for iter = [1:maxit]
    p2 = p1;p1 = p0;
    s2 = s1;s1 = s0;
    alpha = r'*s1 / (s1'*s1);
    x += alpha * p1;
    r -= alpha * s1;
    if (r'*r < tol^2)
      break
    end
    p0 = s1;
    s0 = A * s1;
    beta1 = s0'*s1 / (s1'*s1);
    p0 -= beta1 * p1;
    s0 -= beta1 * s1;
    if iter > 1
      beta2 = s0'*s2 / (s2'*s2);
      p0 -= beta2 * p2;
      s0 -= beta2 * s2;
    end
  end
end

References

External links 
 Minimal Residual Method, Wolfram MathWorld, Jul 26, 2022.
Numerical linear algebra